Moslem Ali Molla was a Member of the 2nd National Assembly of Pakistan as a representative of East Pakistan.

Career
Molla was a Member of the 2nd National Assembly of Pakistan.

References

Pakistani MNAs 1955–1958
Possibly living people
People of East Pakistan